Mirzali Abbasov (Azerbaijani: Mirzəli Hacı Abbas oğlu Abbasov; b. 1874, Russian Empire – d. Tiflis, Georgian SSR, USSR, 3 November 1943) was an actor of the Azerbaijani theater in Tiflis. Honored artist of the Republic (1924).

Life 
He made his debut in 1898 as Farrash in Mirza Akhundov's comedy "Adventures of the Lankaran Khanate Vizier". Performed in the Azerbaijani drama troupe in Tiflis, participated in tours in Tabriz, Tashkent and others. cities. He was one of the organizers, leading actor and director of the Azerbaijani theater in Tiflis since 1916. He played mostly tragic roles in a manner similar to the famous Azerbaijani actor Huseyn Arablinski. The most significant roles: Qajar in Hagverdiyev's historical tragedy "Aga Muhammed Shah Qajar", Othello in the tragedy of V. Shakespeare, Franz in the drama F. Schiller's "Robbers". Also he is the author of a number of plays.

References 

1874 births
1943 deaths
People from the Russian Empire
Burials at Pantheon of prominent Azerbaijanis
Azerbaijani-language writers
Soviet actors
Actors from Georgia (country)
Azerbaijani actors
Male actors from the Russian Empire